This is a list of episodes from the first season of Impractical Jokers.

Episodes

Notes

References

External links 
 Official website
 

Impractical Jokers
2011 American television seasons
2012 American television seasons